The Petty Demon, also translated as The Little Demon, is a Symbolist novel by Russian writer Fyodor Sologub. It was published in a standalone edition in 1907 and quickly became popular, having ten printings during the author's lifetime.

Plot 
The novel recounts the story of the sadist schoolteacher Peredonov in an unnamed Russian provincial town. The other plotline presents the idyllic loves of the boy Sasha Pylnikov and Ludmila Rutilova. Peredonov lives in constant hatred to the world around him and to the life itself and believes that all live in constant hatred of him. Throughout the novel Peredonov struggles to be promoted to governmental inspector of his province and starts going paranoid and hallucinates with a mysterious little demon Nedotykomka. He finally commits murder in a state of insanity.

Literary significance 
The realistic and satirical depiction of Russian provincial life and the omniscient third-person narrative allowed Sologub to combine his Symbolist tendencies and the tradition of Russian Realism in which he engaged throughout his earlier novels, a style similar to Maupassant's fantastic realism.

The novel may be read as a satire on Russian province, but Sologub's intention was to paint life itself as an evil creation of God. The grotesque Russian town and the world of The Petty Demon are incarnations of poshlost', a Russian concept that has characteristics of both evil and banality, and Peredonov and his demon Nedotykomka are the personifications of poshlost'''. As D. S. Mirsky wrote in 1925, "Peredonov has become the most famous and memorable character of Russian fiction since The Brothers Karamazov", and his name has become a word of the literary language: "It stands for the incarnation of sullen evil, which knows no joy and resents others' knowing it". According to Mirsky, Peredonov forms a 'trinity' together with Fyodor Dostoevsky's Foma Opiskin and Mikhail Saltykov-Shchedrin's Porfiry Golovlyov.

 English translations The Little Demon authorized trans. John Cournos and Richard Aldington (London: M. Secker, 1916).The Petty Demon trans. Andrew Field (New York: Random House, 1962).The Petty Demon trans. Samuel D. Cioran (Ann Arbor: Ardis, 1983) (with an appendix and critical articles ed. Murl Barker). .The Little Demon trans. Ronald Wilks (New York: Penguin, 1994) (Penguin Twentieth Century Classics). .

 See also 
 The Silver Dove''
 Petersburg (novel)
 Russian symbolism

References 

1905 Russian novels
Symbolist novels
Russian satirical novels